Neptis swynnertoni, or Swynnerton's sailer, is a butterfly in the family Nymphalidae. It is found in southern Malawi, west central Mozambique and eastern Zimbabwe. The habitat consists of montane forests.

Adults are on wing from September to May.

The larvae feed on Macaranga mellifera.

References

Butterflies described in 1912
swynnertoni